This is a list of churches in the City of London which were rebuilt after the Great Fire of London (or in a later date) but have been demolished since then. All were designed by Sir Christopher Wren except All Hallows Staining, Holy Trinity Gough Square, St Alphege London Wall, St James Duke's Place, St Katherine Coleman, St Martin Outwich, St Peter le Poer and the non-Anglican churches and chapels.

Sometimes there is still some sign that a place of worship was once there. Parish register details were often transferred to the subsuming parish.

Completely demolished

Tower remains

Other denominations

See also
List of churches destroyed in the Great Fire of London and not rebuilt
List of Christopher Wren churches in London

General:
 List of demolished buildings and structures in London

References

Bibliography

Churches
Churches, London
Churches
London

Churches